Örənqala (also, Orankala) is a village and municipality in the Beylagan Rayon of Azerbaijan.  It has a population of 1,840.

Notable natives 

 Nazim Guliyev — National Hero of Azerbaijan.

References 

Populated places in Beylagan District